Kevin McLeod (born 28 June 1949) is  a former Australian rules footballer who played with Footscray in the Victorian Football League (VFL).

Notes

External links 		
		
		
		
		
		
		
Living people		
1949 births		
		
Australian rules footballers from Victoria (Australia)		
Western Bulldogs players